Telochurus recens, the scarce vapourer, is a moth of the subfamily Lymantriinae found in Europe. The species was first described by Jacob Hübner in 1819. The moth flies from June to July depending on the location. The larvae feed on various deciduous trees, such as Crataegus and Salix species. This species has commonly been placed in the genus Orgyia but molecular analyses support its exclusion from that genus, and placement in the genus Telochurus.

References

External links

"Orgyia (Clethrogyna) recens (Hübner 1819)". Fauna Europaea. Archived 20 March 2017.
"10396 Orgyia recens (Hübner, [1819) - Eckfleck-Bürstenspinner, Eckfleck-Bürstenbinder"]. Lepiforum e. V. Retrieved 16 May 2020. 
"Orgyia recens (Hübner, 1819)". Schmetterlinge-Deutschlands.de. Retrieved 16 May 2020. 

Lymantriinae
Moths described in 1819
Moths of Europe
Taxa named by Jacob Hübner